Minsk Kristall (Minsk Kryshtal) is a distillery in Belarus.

The company based in Minsk was founded by brothers Yankel Rakaushchyk and Zelman Rakaushchyk in 1893. During the Russian Civil War the distillery was nationalized by the Russian Bolsheviks and used as warehouses. In 1924 the Soviet Union government allowed production of spirits and the former Rakaushchyk Brothers distillery was activated again.

The distillery is controlled by the Government of Belarus. Its products include Minsk Vodka, Belaya Rus vodka, and Kryshtal Etalon.

External links
Minsk Kristall Official website
Minsk Kristall Distribution in Germany

Companies based in Minsk
Food and drink companies of Belarus
Drink companies of the Soviet Union
Distilleries
Companies nationalised by the Soviet Union